Richard Bennett (born 5 June 1965) is an Australian former cricketer. He played 35 first-class matches for Tasmania between 1984 and 1992.

See also
 List of Tasmanian representative cricketers

References

External links
 

1965 births
Living people
Australian cricketers
Tasmania cricketers
Cricketers from Launceston, Tasmania